Money Money 2020 is the debut studio album by new wave band the Network (a Green Day side project). It was released on September 30, 2003, through Adeline Records. Members of Green Day have denied being involved in the Network, however, Mike Dirnt revealed that they had a hand in the album.  It was the band's only release for seventeen years, upon which they returned in 2020 with a sequel album entitled Money Money 2020 Part II: We Told Ya So!

Background 
The album came with a DVD that featured six music videos for songs on the album directed and produced by Roy Miles of AntiDivision. It was re-released by Reprise Records on November 9, 2004. This release did not include the DVD, but it did include two additional tracks, "Teenagers from Mars" and "Hammer of the Gods".  The song "Roshambo" was featured in the video game NHL 2005, and "Teenagers from Mars" was featured in the video game Tony Hawk's American Wasteland.  The album was later released on vinyl by Adeline Records in 2011 and 2015, but only featured the 12 tracks from the original release.

Track listing

Personnel 
 Fink – lead vocals, lead guitar, backing vocals, drums on "Hungry Hungry Models"
 Van Gough – lead vocals, bass guitar, backing vocals
 The Snoo – drums, lead vocals on "Hungry Hungry Models"
 Z – keyboards, backing vocals, keytar on "Right Hand-A-Rama"
 Captain Underpants – keytar, keyboards on "Right Hand-A-Rama"
 Balducci – rhythm guitar

References

2003 debut albums
The Network albums
Adeline Records albums